Fananserin (RP-62203) is a drug which acts as a potent antagonist at both the 5HT2A receptor, and the Dopamine D4 receptor, but without blocking other dopamine receptors such as D2. It has sedative and antipsychotic effects, and has been researched for the treatment of schizophrenia, although efficacy was less than expected and results were disappointing.

References 

Antipsychotics
Fluoroarenes
Piperazines
Nitrogen heterocycles
Sulfur heterocycles
D4 antagonists
5-HT2A antagonists
Sulfonamides
Heterocyclic compounds with 3 rings